No es bueno que el hombre esté solo is a 1973 Spanish drama film directed by Pedro Olea. Its music was composed by Alfonso G. Santisteban.

Cast
 Carmen Sevilla as Lina
 José Luis López Vázquez as Martín
 Máximo Valverde as Mauro
 Eduardo Fajardo as Don Alfonso
 José Franco as Dario
 Helga Liné as Mónica
 Lolita Merino as Cati
 Raquel Rodrigo as Mujer de club
 Betsabé Ruiz as Chica de club
 Enrique Ferpi as Cliente de club
 José Riesgo as Agente
 Ángel Menéndez as Ingeniero

References

External links
 

1973 films
1970s Spanish-language films
Spanish drama films
Films directed by Pedro Olea
Films with screenplays by José Luis Garci
Films shot in Spain